Scenery Hill Historic District is a historic district in Scenery Hill, Pennsylvania, listed on the National Register of Historic Places in 1996. It is a typical Pike Town along the National Road. The district contains 93 buildings of many types: taverns, shops, service facilities and residences. Most of the commercial buildings are clustered in the center of the district, east of the National Road (now U.S. Route 40) intersection with Spring Valley and Fava Farm Roads.

Two buildings also have separate listings on the national register. Hill's Tavern is the central landmark in the district and, until a fire on August 17, 2015, heavily damaged it, had still been in use as a restaurant and hotel, now called the Century Inn.  The Ringland Tavern (1827) is not currently in use.

It is designated as a historic district by the Washington County History & Landmarks Foundation.

References

External links
[ Scenery Hill Historic District Building Inventory]

Houses on the National Register of Historic Places in Pennsylvania
Queen Anne architecture in Pennsylvania
Italianate architecture in Pennsylvania
Historic districts in Washington County, Pennsylvania
Houses in Washington County, Pennsylvania
Historic districts on the National Register of Historic Places in Pennsylvania
National Register of Historic Places in Washington County, Pennsylvania